The Median dynasty, also known as the Cyaxarid dynasty, was, according to Herodotus, a dynasty composed of four kings who ruled for 150 years under the Median Empire. If Herodotus' story is true, the Medes were unified by a man named Deioces, the first of the four kings who would rule the Medan Empire, a mighty empire that included large parts of Iran and eastern Anatolia.

Chronology 
Using the chronology proposed by Herodotus, the Mede kings reigned on the following dates:

Herodotus' numbers are suspect: the first two and the last two kings ruled exactly 75 years, which adds up to 150 years. There is no need to doubt the existence of Cyaxares and Astyages, as they are mentioned in contemporary sources. The first kings, Deioces and Fraortes, are not mentioned in historical sources, but scholars have tried to find their names in other relevant sources. Thus, a Manite chief named Daiaukku, mentioned several times in Neo-Assyrian texts from the time of Sargon II, was identified with Deioces. Daiaukku is mentioned in Assyrian sources as the governor of the province of Mannea who joined the king of Urartu against the Manite ruler, but he was captured by Sargon, who exiled him along with his family in Syria in 715 BC Apparently he died there.

Based on Herodotus' assertion that Scythian rule over the Medes lasted about 28 years, scholars have postponed the start of the Medal chronology to the year 728 BC This would allow them to identify Fraortes, the second king fear, with Kashtariti, leader of the Meda revolt against Assyria in 672 BC This identification is based on the Behistun Inscription statement of a fear called Fravartis (or Fraortes in the Greek transcription), who revolted against the Persian king Darius the Great in 522 BC, claimed to be XšaØrita "of the family of Cyaxares". However, some scholars tend to reject the identification of Fraortes, son of Deioces, with Kashtariti or consider it doubtful. If the beginning of Deioces' reign is moved to 728 BC, the absolute chronology of his dynasty can be presented as follows:

However, this chronology was rejected by scholars when Rene Labat demonstrated that, in various manuscripts of Herodotus' Histories, the 28 years of Scythian rule were included in the reign of Cyaxares and theehortes chronologically could not be Kashtariti of the Assyrian sources. Edwin Grantovski argued that this chronological problem could be solved on cuneiform sources, which date the Meda revolt against Assyria in 672 BC and the end of the Meda dynasty in 550 BC He offered the following dates:

Thus, according to Grantovski, the Median dynasty has existed for about 120 years; Déjoces overthrew the Assyrian rule and founded the Medal dynasty. Fraortes subjugated the Persians. Cyaxares began to conquer Upper Asia when the Assyrians were defeated in 612 BC and their empire lasted until 550 BC As for Scythian domination over the Medes and other countries, Herodotus' declaration has a legendary and unreliable character as it cannot be reconciled with the real history of Media in the 7th century BC and with all the rest of the ancient Near East.

The dates that Herodotus attributes to Medes kings add up to 150 years, yet according to another account by Herodotus, Medes ruled northern Asia for 128 years. In this case, the beginning of the Meda dynasty should be dated to the year 678 BC, that is, some years before the revolt against the Assyrians. It is possible to reconcile the seeming contradiction of Herodotus' data. Herodotus attributes 53 years of reign to Déjoces and 22 years to Fraortes. George Rawlinson proposed that Fraortes rule for 53 years and Déjoces for 22 years. With this change, the dates between 678 and 625 BC are obtained for the reign of Fraortes. Thus, according to Rawlinson, the sum of the reigns of the three kings (53+40+35) after Déjoces would then be the 128 years that Herodotus mentioned. Fraortes overthrew the Assyrian rule and, as Herodotus claims, attacked the Persian tribes and began to subjugate all Asia, one people after another. The results of the archaeological excavations of Bestam, located north of Lake Urmia, allow us to assume that the Medes attacked Urartu even before they began to subjugate the Persian tribes. Therefore, the starting point of the 128-year period of Medal supremacy is likely to be the accession of Kashtariti/Fraortes, who began ruling a few years before the successful revolt against Assyrian Empire and reigned for 53 years . As for Deioces, father of Fraortes, he was just a leader of the Medes, who began to consolidate the unity of the Medes tribes. It is possible that he was just the eponymous founder of the Meda royal house. At Diakonoff's suggestion, Herodotus oversimplified the event and transferred to Deioces the activities of several generations of Medio chiefs, attributing to him the founding of the fear realm. Cyaxares, in coalition with Babylon, conquered the Neo-Assyrian Empire and established its rule over Asia east of the river Halys, and Astyages succeeded him. So the dynasty of the Medes kings can be presented as follows:

It is known from cuneiform sources that Media won its independence under Kashtariti. Obviously, Herodotus included in the 53 years of the reign of Deioces the reigns of his unnamed successors: the son of Kashtariti and grandson, also Deioces. The first-born were named usually after their grandfather, for example, the older Achaemenids: Cyrus I, Cambyses I, Cyrus II, Cambyses II. Then the list of Median kings: 

Explanations: 

1. Herodotus' statement that Deioces was the son of Phraortes refers to Deiocus I. This Phraortes was not a king.

2. Deioces I was captured by Sargon II in 715 BC and exiled to Hamat. It is quite possible that the Sennacherib, son of Sargon II, returned him to Media as the ruler of Karkashshi in 700 BC - according to cuneiform data, Kashtariti, the alleged son of Deiokas I, subsequently ruled there. Sennacherib made his Median campaign in 700 BC - the date of Herodotus about the beginning of the reign of Deiocus is confirmed. 

3. Kashtariti is mentioned as "King of the Medes" in an inscription dated 678 BC. He died in battle with the Scythians during the uprising of Shamash-shum-ukin 652-648 ВC. 

4. Cyaxares is mentioned in the inscriptions of Sargon II. He was a contemporary of Deioces I, and therefore could not have been Kashtariti. But Kashtariti is Semitic, and Cyaxares is the Greek pronunciation of the Iranian name XšaØrita that is comparable to an Indian Kshatriyas of the Vedic era. If Kashtariti is identical Cyaxares I then his descendant, who ruled in 625-585 BC, should be called Cyaxares II. 

5. According to Herodotus, Phraortes was the son of Deioces, obviously Deioces II. Then Cyaxares II was named after his great predecessor Kashtariti.

Genealogy 
Family tree of the Median dynasty and its kinship with the Babylons, Lydians and Persians, according to records of historians Herodotus, Berossus and Ctesias. According to Berossus, Nebuchadnezzar married Amitis, daughter of Astyages. It is impossible for Amitis to be the daughter of Astyages, for he was still too young during Nabopolassar's reign to have children, and not yet king; it seems more likely that Amitis was the daughter of Cyaxares and therefore the sister of Astyages. Astyages would have married Arienis, but it is uncertain whether he was the father of any sons or daughters. Herodotus and Xenophon claim that he had a daughter named Mandane, who would have married Cambyses I and would have been the mother of Cyrus the Great. Ctesias denied the veracity of this statement and stated that Astyages had a daughter named Amitis, who married Spitamas and after his death she would have married Cyrus the Great.

Sovereigns timeline

References

Bibliography 

 Labat, René (1961). “Kaštariti, Phraorte et les débuts de l’histoire Mède”. JA 249. p. 1-12.

 
Iranian dynasties
Pages with unreviewed translations
Medes